Above Znoneofthe (born 28 June 1969) is a Canadian politician and perennial candidate. He changed his name to "Above Znoneofthe" with a silent "Z" so that his name would be placed last on alphabetical ballots (hence reflecting the idea of voting for None of the Above).

Biography 
While a university student, Znoneofthe ran in the 1993 Canadian federal election as a candidate for the short-lived National Party of Canada in the Ontario riding of Markham—Whitchurch-Stouffville, earning about 1% of the vote.

Znoneofthe decided to re-enter politics in 2015, and legally changed his name so that it would appear on electoral ballots as "Znoneofthe, Above", adding a silent Z so that his name would appear at the bottom of alphabetical-order ballots. Znoneofthe explained that his name was chosen for those who do not usually vote, telling CBC News that he thought, "one of these days we should get ‘none of the above’ on a ballot."

He first ran under his changed name in a provincial by-election in Whitby—Oshawa on 11 February 2016; however, since Ontario electoral ballots list candidates' names with their given names first, he appeared as "Above Znoneofthe".

During a by-election in Ottawa—Vanier, Znoneofthe attempted to participate in a debate that he was not invited to, as a candidate under the None of the Above party. Audience members shouted for Znoneofthe and another candidate who was not invited to leave, but neither left until escorted off of the stage by police. Znoneofthe did appear last on the alphabetical order list of candidates in the CBC News article detailing the incident.

He has since run in several by-elections as an independent and as a member of the None of the Above Party, and most recently contested Prime Minister Justin Trudeau's riding of Papineau in the 2021 Canadian federal election as a member of the Rhinoceros Party.

Electoral record

Federal

Ontario

As Sheldon Bergson

References

Living people
Independent candidates in Ontario provincial elections
1969 births